Gudia may refer to:

 Gudia (caste), confectionery community of odisha
 Gudja, a village in Malta
 Gudia (1947 film), an Indian drama film
 Gudia (1997 film), an Indian drama film